Isaiah Ross (born November 6, 1981) is a former American football guard. He was signed by the San Diego Chargers as an undrafted free agent in 2004. He played college football at Nevada.

Ross was also a member of the Nashville Kats, New Orleans VooDoo, New Orleans Saints, Minnesota Vikings, Washington Redskins and California Redwoods.

External links
Just Sports Stats
Washington Redskins bio
United Football League bio

1981 births
Living people
Players of American football from California
American football offensive guards
Nevada Wolf Pack football players
San Diego Chargers players
Frankfurt Galaxy players
Nashville Kats players
New Orleans VooDoo players
New Orleans Saints players
Minnesota Vikings players
Washington Redskins players
Sacramento Mountain Lions players
Sportspeople from Elk Grove, California